Thomas Fulljames (died 1847) was a land surveyor in Gloucestershire, lord of the manor, and justice of the peace.

Family
Fulljames was the son of Thomas Fulljames, a Kent schoolteacher. He had a brother, Trophimus Fulljames, who also became a land surveyor, and a sister Harriet who married advantageously to James Wintle.

In 1797 he married Sophia Greaves in Hayes, Kent. The couple had no children. His nephew was the architect also named Thomas Fulljames.

Career
Fulljames developed a successful practice in Gloucestershire from the 1790s. By 1800 he was farming in Ashleworth where he was also lord of the manor. In 1806 he purchased Hasfield Court and by 1826 had expanded the estate to 200 acres. In 1844 he purchased the Hasfield manor estate and with it land in Corse and Ashleworth.

He served as a justice of the peace in the counties of Gloucestershire and Worcestershire.

Death
Fulljames died in 1847.

References 

1847 deaths
Year of birth missing
English surveyors
Lords of the Manor
English justices of the peace